Film Fest Ghent, spelt Film Fest Gent in Flemish and also known as International Film Fest Gent, is an annual international film festival in Ghent, Belgium. The festival held its first edition in 1974, under the name Internationaal Filmgebeuren Gent, and has since grown into the largest film festival in Belgium. The festival also puts the spotlight on film music; since 2001, Film Fest Ghent has hosted the World Soundtrack Awards, a series of prizes for the best soundtracks for film and television.

The festival takes place every year in October, with an international jury awarding the Grand Prix for Best Film and the Georges Delerue Award for Best Soundtrack or Sound Design. Apart from the official competition, there are sections such as global cinema, classics, and an annual special focus.

From 2000 to 2018, a European short film competition was organised. In 2019, the short film competition was reformed into an international competition, with the International Short Film Award as the main prize.

History

1974-1978 
Under the name 'Het Eerste Internationaal Filmgebeuren van Gent' (or 'Ghent's First International Film Event'), the very first 'Film Fest Ghent' took place from 25 to 31 January 1974. The driving forces behind the initiative were Ben Ter Elst, manager of the Studio Skoop, and Dirk De Meyer of the Ghent University Film Club. Their aim was to programme films that did not get a chance in the regular cinemas because of their content and style. The first small-scale edition had about twenty titles on the menu and was screened in Studio Skoop and in the Capitool. The programme included Solaris by Andrei Tarkovsky and Winter Wind by Miklós Jancsó, films that provoke, innovate and cast a different light on what cinema can be. This way, the event launched new names and stimulated interest in arthouse cinema. It laid the foundation for a film festival that offers a wide-ranging panorama of world cinema.

In 1978, 'Het Internationaal Filmgebeuren van Gent' grew into a film festival that presented about fifty films in various sections. Gradually, more and more attention was paid to film education and a festival offer that would appeal to various target audiences. During the year of 1978, cinephiles could find something to their liking among author films by, for instance, Luis Buñuel, Rainer Werner Fassbinder, Bernardo Bertolucci and Alejandro Jodorowsky. However, due to the exponential growth of the festival, there was a great desire for a clear structure. Even more so, since the international film landscape evolved rapidly at the time, the event encountered several organisational and financial problems despite the success of the initiative. The festival thus needed a fresh and new organisational structure in order to reach international maturity.

1979-1984 
Jacques Dubrulle, active in film production and communication, gave a fresh impetus to the suffering festival. He developed a much-needed structure and in 1979 he founded a non-profit organisation that served as the essential backbone of the festival. The creation of this non-profit organisation ensured that the authorities (the city of Ghent, the province of East Flanders, the federal and (later) the Flemish government) would participate and contribute financially. Within this structure, John Bultinck became the very first chairman.

In this period, the festival was booming due to further internationalisation and an impressive guest list. Amongst others, King Hu, Maximillian Schell and Bertrand Tavernier paid a visit to Ghent. In 1981, thanks to the inauguration of the Decascoop complex (today's Kinepolis), Ghent welcomed a new cinema with spacious cinema theatres and state-of-the-art technology. On top of that, the programme expanded to about a hundred films. The modernisation of the festival thus ensured a much broader audience and offer. In 1983, the non-profit organisation changed its name to 'Internationaal Filmgebeuren van Vlaanderen-Gent' (or 'International Film Event of Flanders-Ghent'). The enthusiastic team helped to ensure that the festival figured as a hallmark of high-quality cinema.

1985-1992 
The year of 1985 marked the beginning of the mass development of the film festival. Both organisationally and financially, the festival evolved into a cultural event of the first order. The significant growth of the event was enabled by a permanent team working on the festival all year round. Moreover, the team managed to develop a long-term vision for the film festival. In search of an identity and a place of its own in an overcrowded film festival calendar, brainstorming sessions were held together with Festival of Flanders, a festival dedicated to classical music. As a result, film music became an important focus of the film festival. In 1985, the International Film Event of Flanders-Ghent organised an international competition with a jury for the first time. André Delvaux, Michael White, Simon Heyworth, Alain Pierre and Loek Dikker were members of the first jury. The main theme of the competition was 'the impact of music on film', a theme that was not on the agenda of any other film festival in the world.

Besides the competition, the festival also decided to organise silent film screenings with newly composed music that was performed live. One of the highlights was the performance of a new score by Georges Delerue for the Russian Casanova (1927) in 1987. Delerue conducted the work himself in a packed Ghent opera. That same year Ennio Morricone gave a concert in a sold-out Kuipke in Ghent. This way, the film festival became an established name in the film music circuit. Other internationally renowned composers such as Jean-Claude Petit, Nicola Piovani, Peer Raben, Stanley Myers, Carl Davis, Bruce Broughton and Michael Nyman also attended the festival to perform their work.

In 1985, the festival presented its first Joseph Plateau Award during the Night of Film. The prize is named after the professor Joseph Plateau from Ghent and is awarded to Belgian film makers who have made a significant contribution to the Belgian film industry. Later the prize would evolve into the Joseph Plateau Honorary Award, a lifetime achievement award for someone from the international film world. In 1992 Jacques Dubrulle and his team decided to change the name 'Filmgebeuren' into 'Film Festival'. During the 90s the International Film Festival of Flanders-Ghent even received several film titles in European or world premieres and hosted big names such as Willem Dafoe, Samuel Fuller, Terry Gilliam, Anthony Perkins, Charlotte Rampling, Paul Schrader, Frederick Wiseman, Patricia Arquette, Kenneth Branagh, Mel Brooks, Crispin Clover, Paul Cox, Atom Egoyan etc.

1993-1999 
In March 1993 the Flemish government declared the International Film Festival of Flanders-Ghent Cultural Ambassador of Flanders. The financial support of the Flemish government resulted in a cash prize for the winner of the international competition. Five years later, the festival was appointed City Ambassador of Ghent. The Ghent-based film festival grew into the biggest film event in Belgium and increasingly attracted more international attention. Famous foreign guests found their way to Ghent. Robert Altman, Elmer Bernstein, Terence Davies, Arthur Penn, James Earl Jones, Guy Pearce, Karl Malden, Danny Glover, Michael Haneke, Irvin Kershner and many others visited Ghent during these years. The focus on film music also continued. A new part of the musical programme was introduced: in 1993 the festival organised a symposium on film music for the first time. Despite the fact that film music did not immediately steal the spotlight in the media, it was an important step for the International Film Festival of Flanders-Ghent to acquire a pilot function. The festival aimed to support young composers and to safeguard the preservation and evolution of film music. The godfather of Belgian film music, Frédéric Devreese, conducted a double concert during the same edition in the then newly reopened Vlaamse Opera Ghent. At this point, film music was firmly anchored in the DNA of the festival.

2000-2007 
The International Film Festival of Flanders-Ghent started the new millennium with an increased interest in the short film genre. In 2000, the audience enjoyed the first European short film competition. Later, in 2019, the festival would open the competition to short films from all over the world, giving short films the full attention they deserve.

The festival was the first in the world to emphasise the importance of film music. Over the years it has organised classical concerts, silent film projections with live music, seminars on film music and hosted important composers. The festival continued to play this pioneering role in the 2000s. In 2000, the world-famous film composer Hans Zimmer was convinced to come to Ghent for his first-ever live performance of his film scores in the presence of Morgan Freeman and Lisa Gerrard. The need to put all the contacts between composers, musicians and agents who attend the festival each year into a fixed structure grew bigger. This is why the festival (led by Jacques Dubrulle, music projects coordinator Marian Ponnet and Brussels Philharmonic conductor Dirk Brossé) launched the World Soundtrack Academy in 2001. During the 2001 edition, the WSA presented the first World Soundtrack Awards. None other than the legendary John Williams received the first Film Composer of the Year Award. The purpose of the WSA is and remains to form an international community for film composers and professionals who promote the art of film music through a series of activities, such as the annual presentation of the World Soundtrack Awards. In 2002, the WSA decided to organise an annual composition contest for young talents. The participants write a new score to an existing film or TV fragment.

The 2000s also saw many prominent guests at the film festival, including Jean Reno, Juliette Binoche, Jeanne Moreau, Blair Underwood, Maurice Jarre, Paul Verhoeven, Darren Aronofsky, Tom Tykwer and Kathleen Turner.

2007-2012 
In September 2007, the American film magazine Variety placed the Ghent-based film festival among the fifty not-to-be-missed festivals in the world. Variety made its choice out of more than a thousand film festivals and selected Ghent because of its unique focus on film music. Moreover, the festival is the only one from the Benelux to appear on the list. The mention shows that the International Film Festival of Flanders-Ghent is on the international map. One year later, the prestigious American newspaper The Wall Street Journal also praised the festival. According to the newspaper the International Film Festival of Flanders-Ghent is among the top five European film festivals with its own character. The film festival is also praised for programming world-class films, affordable ticket prices and the opportunity to meet world-renowned stars. The Wall Street Journal highlights the fact that film music greats (such as Elmer Bernstein, Ennio Morricone, Howard Shore, Hans Zimmer and Gabriel Yared) all came to perform their works at the festival. Finally, there is praise for the young audience that characterises the festival.

During this period, the attention for underexposed themes and audiences in the film industry grew gradually. Specific efforts were made to program LGBTQ-films and film screenings for the blind and visually impaired. Professionals also got more involved by organising 'The Day of the Film Profession' and a physical Press & Industry Office. Meanwhile, film school students could obtain accreditation for the festival, with the aim of stimulating the formation of a new generation of filmmakers.

From 2010 onwards, each edition would feature a curated exhibition around an icon of film history. The first exhibition was dedicated to the French film maker Jacques 'Monsieur Hulot' Tati. The following year, former film journalist Patrick Duynslaegher became the artistic director of the festival. In his first edition, Scandinavia took centre stage and the legendary Ingmar Bergman figured as the subject of a retrospective and the annual exhibition.

Many renowned talents from the film industry visited Ghent during the period of 2007 to 2012: Clint Mansell, Woody Harrelson, Richard Jenkins, Andy Garcia, Kevin Costner, Shigeru Umebayashi, László Nemes, Tim Robbins, Paul Greengrass, Jim Sheridan, François Ozon, Norman Jewison, Seth Rogen, Isabelle Huppert, Ezra Miller, Emmannuelle Riva, Paolo & Vittori Taviani, Jean-Pierre & Luc Dardenne etc.

2013-2019 
The 40th edition of the film festival took place in 2013. During this year, the film festival underwent a few changes. Founder Jacques Dubrulle left the organisation and the power within the board was redistributed. The festival underwent a real transformation and celebrated this festive year with a new name: Film Fest Ghent. The very first edition under the new name focused on American Independent Cinema. During the festival Dubrulle received the Joseph Plateau Honorary Award for his years of commitment to the organisation of Film Fest Ghent. From this period onwards, the organisation of Film Fest Ghent decided to support a good cause every edition, with the goal of raising money and bringing films to an audience that cannot always afford to go to the cinema.

The following year, the festival focused on French cinema. Catherine Deneuve (in Belle de jour) was on the official festival poster. The festival also celebrated the centenary of Chaplin's iconic character of the tramp with screenings of The Circus (in Kuipke Ghent with live music) and The Gold Rush (in the Stadshal of Ghent). Erik Van Looy's much hyped film Loft opened the festival and later became one of the greatest Belgian films of all time (in its own country). The annual exhibition was entirely devoted to the oeuvre of Italian filmmaker Federico Fellini. To enhance the exhibition, a concert was organised with film music by Nino Rota for Fellini's films.

The following editions paid special attention to British, Nordic, Italian, Hungarian and Spanish cinema. In 2016, Japan took centre stage and Film Fest Ghent welcomed composer Ryuichi Sakamoto to the World Soundtrack Awards Gala where he received the Lifetime Achievement Award. The 2017 edition, with Italy as the central country, promoted itself with Claudia Cardinale on the campaign image. The music section drew attention to the centenary of jazz with a Symphonic Jazz Concert and the laudation of trumpeter and jazz musician Terence Blanchard at the WSA. The 2018 edition of Film Fest Ghent had a Hungarian focus, and a retrospective was organised presenting the films of Miklós Jancsó. That edition kicked off with the premiere of Girl, one of the most lauded Belgian films with, among others, a Caméra d'Or for director Lukas Dhont at the Cannes Film Festival. There also were some new things to discover in terms of music. Vooruit and Film Fest Ghent presented a unique crossover between film and music called 'Videodroom', which became an annual part of the festival. Guest of honour at the WSA was Carter Burwell, mainly known for his collaborations with the Coen brothers. For the very first time, his music was performed live.

In 2019, Wim De Witte, who has been active in the organisation for years, succeeded Patrick Duynslaegher as artistic director.  The film programme included a focus on Spain with a series of contemporary Spanish films and a retrospective of taboo-breaking Spanish filmmakers such as Luis Buñuel, Agustí Villaronga, Victor Erice, Alejandro Amenábar and Pedro Almodóvar. During this year, Film Fest Ghent also decided to endeavour for a revaluation of the short film genre. For the first time, the international short film competition received short films from all over the world and became a more prominent part of the festival programme. In addition, the Belgian student short film competition was already well-established within the festival for years. Marco Beltrami was the guest of honour at the World Soundtrack Awards Gala. At the gala, Film Fest Ghent and the World Soundtrack Academy honoured the renowned Belgian film music composer Frédéric Devreese with a live performance of his music for films such as Un soir, un train and Benvenuta.

During the period of 2013 to 2019, the following guests found their way to Film Fest Ghent: Joseph Gordon-Levitt, Bret Easton Ellis, Sergei Loznitsa, Yorgos Lanthimos, Colin Farrell, Sir Alan Parker, Michael Nyman, Craig Armstrong, Alan Silvestri, Ryuichi Sakamoto, Kôji Fukada, Terence Davies, Tran Anh Hung, Ken Loach, Olivier Assayas, Derek Cianfrance, Asghar Farhadi, Isabelle Huppert, Leila Hatami, Geraldine Chaplin, Rian Johnson, Thomas Vinterberg, John C. Reilly, Jacques Audiard, Terence Blanchard and Jayro Bustamante.

2020 
In 2020, Film Fest Ghent was forced to adapt the festival to a different format, due to the COVID-19 pandemic. The team opted for a hybrid festival with both physical screenings and screenings on a VOD platform. The programme focused on German cinema, and also included a new section entitled "Official Selection: Masters & New Voices". The retrospective was dedicated to the Neue Deutsche Welle, with films by Fassbinder, Herzog, Wenders, Margarethe von Trotta, Helma Sanders-Brahms and others. The most important international guests were actor-director Viggo Mortensen, who presented his directorial debut Falling and received the Joseph Plateau Honorary Award, the author-director Pedro Costa and the French actress-director Maïwenn.

During this edition, the festival wanted to show solidarity with filmmakers, cinemas and colleagues who had to cancel their festivals due to the health crisis. All participants and audiences wore masks.

The year also marked the 20th anniversary of  the World Soundtrack Awards, which took place online and was able to  be followed around the world via livestream. Gabriel Yared performed his compositions live, and audiences could see the reactions from composers such as Alexandre Desplat, Hildur Guðnadóttir and Nicholas Britell. For the occasion, Screen magazine published a supplement to the World Soundtrack Awards, highlighting the history of the awards and guests of honour Desplat, Yared and Michael Abels.

2021 
The 48th edition of Film Fest Gent takes place from 12 to 23 October and explores the Greek film world, which has been revived internationally since the "Greek Weird Wave". The festival poster depicts Efthymis Filippou, the Greek screenwriter who regularly collaborates with Yorgos Lanthimos (Dogtooth, The Lobster). Looking back at a tumultuous past, the 'Classics' are entirely devoted to the oeuvre of Theo Angelopoulos. For the first time ever, his complete oeuvre can be seen in Belgium. The festival opens with the explosive Belgian thriller La Civil by Teodora Ana Mihai. Wes Anderson's The French Dispatch closes the programme. With the programme tag 'Why We Fight', the festival draws attention to positive aggression while supporting non-profit organisation Touché. Gaspar Noé's emotionally overwhelming film Vortex wins the Grand Prix. Film Fest Gent honours two directors with a Joseph Plateau Honorary Award: Andrea Arnold and Harry Kümel. Notable guests at FFG2021 include Pablo Larraín, Leos Carax, Ari Folman, Miguel Gomes, Radu Jude, Renates Reinsve, Ludivine Sagnier and Avi Mograbi. Exceptionally, the Courtisane Festival runs parallel to the final days of Film Fest Gent, leading to a very diverse programme. The World Soundtrack Awards welcome Max Richter as guest of honour and celebrates Greek composer Eleni Karaindrou. The top prize at the WSA goes to Daniel Pemberton.

2022 
Running from 11 to 22 October 2022, the 49th edition of Film Fest Gent once again features a challenging programme of films from all over the globe. In a world that seems increasingly curse, a solid dose of resilience ('veerkracht' in Dutch) is required to avoid burning out. 'Veerkracht' thus forms one of the themes of the festival, linked to a solidarity action for the OverKop house in Gent. In the programme there is a tag devoted to theme, which includes Explore Award winner How to Save a Dead Friend by Marusya Syroechkovskaya. Because of the enormous popularity and subversive quality, the festival puts a spotlight on South Korean cinema, with a separate section in the film programme (Focus on South Korean Cinema), a retrospective (curated by Patrick Duynslaegher) and a film music concert (Korean Composers) in De Bijloke. The retrospective, presented in the 'Classics' section, focuses on the rise of Korean cinema in the 21st century with films such as The Host (2006, Bong Joon-ho) and Burning (2018, Lee Chang-dong). Consequently, the festival poster features South Korean composer Jung Jae-il, known for Parasite and Squid Game. In the feature film competition, still bearing the subtitle 'the impact of music on film', Alice Diop's French courtroom drama Saint Omer wins the top prize. Diop receives the Grand Prix in person during the award ceremony. The jury - consisting of Clio Barnard, Welket Bungué, Daniel Hart, Alexandre Koberidze, Nathalie Álvarez Mesén and Nico Leunen is captivated "by the rigour and restraint of both the filmmaking and the performances in this exceptional film. The question of what we have inherited from the previous generation and what we pass on to the next resonates on many levels and is cleverly interwoven throughout a film which is deeply affecting and continues to resonate long after the film has ended. The director uses the scenic device the courtroom to interrogate the complexity of societal prejudice and oppression, examining the profound impact of othering, shaming and demonisation in a film which is both original and innovative." The International Jury also hands out two Special Mentions: to Klondike by Maryna Er Gorbach and Tengo sueños eléctricos by Valentina Maurel. The Georges Delerue Award for Best Music goes to Michael Koch's understated drama Drii Winter with a poetic score composed by Tobias Koch and Jannik Giger.

In the International Short Film Competition, with jury members Bendt Eyckermans, Diana Cam Van Nguyen and Elena Lazic, Douwe Dijkstra's Neighbour Abdi wins the Award for Best International Short. A Special Mention goes to Cherries by Vytautas Katkus. In the Competition for Belgian Student Shorts, Finn's Heel by Cato Kusters receives the Award for Best Belgian Student Short. Special Mentions go to La chute (Sebastian Schaevers) and Merci pour votre patience! (Simon van der Zande). The audience picks the latter as the. winner of the THE PACK Audience Award for Best Belgian Student Short.

In a year in which Belgian cinema manages to score internationally, the opening film - Close by Lukas Dhont - generates a lot of buzz. For the opening night, the red carpet at Kinepolis Gent has been turned into a field flowers. After Girl in 2018, it's the second time Dhont opens the festival. The closing film is Maria Schrader's investigative drama She Said, based on the Pulitzer Prize-winning New York times investigation. Once again, a large number of (inter)national filmmakers attend the festival in person. Among them: Céline Sciamma (director of Portrait de la jeune fille en feu). After a screening of her latest film, Petite Maman, she has an in-depth talk with Lukas Dhont, who later hands her a Joseph Plateau Honorary Award. Belgian animation pioneer Raouls Servais also receives this award, when presenting his new film Der lange Kerl. Other prominent guests include Marie Kreutzer (Corsage), Zar Amir-Ebrahimi & Mehdi Bajestani (Holy Spider), Cristian Mungiu (R.M.N.), Mascha Halberstad (Oink), Albert Serra (Pacifiction), Michael Koch (Drii Winter), Colm Bairéad (The Quiet Girl), Lola Quivoron (Rodeo), Tarik Saleh (Boy from Heaven), Josh Gordon (Lyle, Lyle, Crocodile), Helan Wittmann (Human Flowers of Flesh), David Lowery (a focus on his 'creative partnership' with Daniel Hart), Jakob Bro (Music for Black Pigeons) and Mia Hansen-Løve (Un beau matin).

The 22nd edition of the World Soundtrack Awards welcomes American film composer and jazz artist Mark Isham as guest of honour. Film Fest Gent dedicates its annual album 'Music for Film' to Isham's oeuvre. French Composer Bruno Coulais receives the Lifetime Achievement Award. At the ceremony, he is honoured by Gabriel Yared (live) and Henry Selick (via video). As per tradition, the winner of the previous year's Discover of the Year is present. Nainita Desai enjoys the performance of her music by Brussels Philharmonic conducted by Dirk Brossé. The winner of the Film Composer of the Year Award is Jonny Greenwood, thanks to his scores for Spencer and Power of the Dog.

Awards 
Every year, numerous awards are handed out at Film Fest Ghent. An international jury assigns two main prizes: the Grand Prix for Best Film and the Georges Delerue Award for Best Soundtrack/Sound Design. The international short film jury awards the Best International Short and the Best Belgian Student Short. The Explore Award is handed out by a youth jury to a film in the Explore Zone programme. Furthermore, the organisation of Film Fest Ghent yearly offers a Joseph Plateau Honorary Award to someone who has had a great impact on the seventh art. The audience in Ghent also has a voice and decides who will take home the North Sea Port Public Choice Award. After a preselection by the Belgian TV channel Canvas, the public also decides who will take home the Canvas Audience Award. On top that, there is also a public prize for the short film that appeals the most to the audience of Ghent. Besides all the film-related prizes, there are of course the World Soundtrack Awards as well, the most important awards for film music.

Grand Prix for Best Film
The Grand Prix is awarded by an international jury and represents a distribution premium of €20,000 and a media campaign worth €27,500.

Georges Delerue Award for Best Soundtrack/Sound Design 
The Georges Delerue Award honours the film with the best soundtrack or sound design. This prize is awarded by an international jury to a film from the international competition. The prize includes a €10,000 distribution premium and a media campaign worth €12,000.

References

External links

Ghent International Film Festival (IMDb)

Film festivals in Belgium
Culture of Ghent
Tourist attractions in East Flanders
Film festivals established in 1974
1974 establishments in Belgium
Events in Ghent